Hörstel is a railway station located in Hörstel, Germany. The station is located on the Löhne–Rheine line. The train services are operated by WestfalenBahn.

Train services
The station is served by the following service(s):

Regional services  Rheine - Osnabrück - Minden - Hanover - Braunschweig
Regional services  Bad Bentheim - Rheine - Osnabrück - Herford - Bielefeld

References

Railway stations in North Rhine-Westphalia